Onslow was launched at Onslow, Nova Scotia in 1817. She moved to England in 1818 and traded with Canada and the West Indies. She foundered on 30 July 1829.

Career
Onslow was registered at Halifax, Nova Scotia, but then re-registered in New Brunswick on 9 October 1820. Even before then she had appeared in Lloyd's Register (LR). She first appeared in the volume for 1818.

Owners did not necessarily keep Lloyd's Register up-to-date. Onslow also traded with Demerara. On 8 October 1822 Onslow, Paul, master put into Barbados. She had lost her masts, deck load, etc.

Fate
On 30 July 1829 Onslow, Walsh, master, sprang a leak and foundered. When she had eight feet of water in her hold her crew abandoned her; they arrived at St Thomas's.  At the time she was on a voyage from Trinidad to Liverpool.

Citations

1817 ships
Ships built in Canada
Age of Sail merchant ships of England
Maritime incidents in September 1822
Maritime incidents in July 1829